Skärmarbrink metro station is on the line 17 and 18 of the Stockholm metro, located in Skärmarbrink, Johanneshov, Söderort. The station, opened on 1 October 1950, then called Hammarby until 16 April 1958, was on the first metro line opened, from Slussen south to Hökarängen via Blåsut. On 16 April 1958, one-station extension to Hammarbyhöjden was opened. Skärmarbrink is connected to Hammarbydepån, a depot/garage for buses and subway trains which is located south of the station.

References

Green line (Stockholm metro) stations
Railway stations opened in 1950
1950 establishments in Sweden